Coachella Valley Savings No. 2, also known as Coachella Valley Savings & Loan Association, Washington Mutual, and Chase Bank is a historic building located in Palm Springs, California. The building is a fine example of the short span of time that master architect E. Stewart Williams used the International Style of architecture for commercial buildings in the early 1960s. It features a flat roof, deep overhangs, steel-frame construction, and a lack of applied ornamentation. The most prominent feature of the structure are the inverted arches of reinforced concrete that rise to form columns that hold up the roof. The building was listed on the National Register of Historic Places in 2016.

References

Commercial buildings completed in 1961
Buildings and structures in Palm Springs, California
National Register of Historic Places in Riverside County, California
Bank buildings on the National Register of Historic Places in California
Modernist architecture in California
E. Stewart Williams buildings
1961 establishments in California